The 46th Biathlon World Championships was held in Nové Město na Moravě, Czech Republic, from 7 to 17 February 2013.

There were a total of 11 competitions: sprint, pursuit, individual, mass start and relay races for both men, women and a mixed relay. All events during the championships also counted for the Biathlon World Cup season.

Norway took a record 8 out of 11 gold medals.

Schedule
All times are local.

Medal winners

Men

Women

Mixed

Medal table

Top nations

Top athletes
All athletes with one gold or two or more medals.

References

External links

IBU

 
Biathlon World Championships 2013
Biathlon World Championships
Biathlon World Championships
Biathlon World Championships 2013
2013
February 2013 sports events in Europe
Biathlon competitions in the Czech Republic